Rebecca Smith (born 14 March 2000) is a Canadian swimmer. She competed in the women's 4 × 100 metre freestyle relay event at the 2017 World Aquatics Championships.

Career
At the 2017 World Championships in Budapest Smith was part of the bronze medal winning team in the 4 × 100 m mixed medley. Later in 2017 Smith was also part of the gold medal 4 × 200 m freestyle 2017 World Junior Swimming Championships team in Indianapolis. In the process the team broke the junior world record and championship record.

In September 2017, Smith was named to Canada's 2018 Commonwealth Games team.

In the Autumn of 2019 she was member of the inaugural International Swimming League (ISL) swimming for the Energy Standard International Swim Club, who won the team title in Las Vegas, Nevada, in December. In spring 2020, Smith signed for the newly formed Toronto Titans, the first and only Canadian team in the ISL.

In June 2021, she qualified to represent Canada at the 2020 Summer Olympics. Smith won a silver medal as part of the Canadian team in the 4×100 m freestyle relay, alongside Kayla Sanchez, Maggie Mac Neil and Penny Oleksiak.

At the 2022 World Aquatics Championships, Smith swam in the heats of the 4x100 m freestyle relay. She was replaced by Mac Neil in the event final, but shared in the team's first-ever silver medal win at the World Championships in a relay. She also competed in the heats of the 4×200 m freestyle relay for the Canadian team, helping to the event final, where she was replaced by Taylor Ruck. She shared in the team's bronze medal win. Later in the summer, named to Canada's team for the 2022 Commonwealth Games, Smith won a bronze medal in the mixed 4×100 m freestyle relay. On the second day of competition, she finished eighth in the 100 m butterfly and won a bronze medal in the 4×100 m freestyle relay. Teammates Maggie Mac Neil and Katerine Savard did the same double. Smith said she was "a little disappointed with my swims tonight." Smith swam the freestyle anchor leg in the heats of the 4×100 m mixed medley, but was replaced by Ruslan Gaziev in the final. She received a silver medal after the team finished second there.

References

External links
 

2000 births
Living people
Canadian female freestyle swimmers
Sportspeople from Red Deer, Alberta
World Aquatics Championships medalists in swimming
Swimmers at the 2018 Commonwealth Games
Commonwealth Games medallists in swimming
Commonwealth Games silver medallists for Canada
Olympic silver medalists for Canada
Olympic silver medalists in swimming
Medalists at the 2020 Summer Olympics
Swimmers at the 2020 Summer Olympics
Medalists at the FINA World Swimming Championships (25 m)
Commonwealth Games bronze medallists for Canada
Swimmers at the 2022 Commonwealth Games
Commonwealth Games competitors for Canada
Medallists at the 2018 Commonwealth Games
Medallists at the 2022 Commonwealth Games